The Central Andean dry puna (NT1001) is an ecoregion in the Montane grasslands and shrublands biome, located in the Andean high plateau, in South America. It is a part of the Puna grassland.

Setting
This ecoregion occupies the southwestern portion of the Altiplano and is located east of the Atacama Desert.

Salt flats, locally known as Salares, are a characteristic feature of this ecoregion. Among the largest salares are Coipasa, Uyuni, Atacama, and Arizaro. Other major geographical features are the lakes Poopó and Coipasa, and the many volcanoes that tower over the altiplano, including Parinacota, Nevado Sajama, Tata Sabaya, Ollagüe, Licancabur, Lascar, Aracar, Socompa  and Llullaillaco. In addition, numerous and colorful small lakes and ponds dot this region. There are seasonal as well as permanent, and have different degrees of salinity.

Climate
This ecoregion has a cold desert climate.

Flora
Typical high Andean wetlands are the Bofedales. These marshy areas are characterized by the presence of cushion bog vegetation. The Yareta grows in well-drained soils. Grasslands are dominated by species of the genera Stipa and Festuca.

Central Andean dry puna is home to Polylepis species, including the Polylepis tarapacana, which is the woody plant that grows at the highest elevations in the world.

Fauna
Camelids, such as llamas, alpacas, vicuñas, are found in this ecoregion. Other mammals include the cougar, Andean mountain cat, Andean fox, and the Andean hairy armadillo.

Three of the flamingo species inhabit here. They are Andean flamingo, James's flamingo, and Chilean flamingo. Other remarkable birds are the Darwin's rhea, Andean condor, puna tinamou, puna teal, puna ibis and the Andean goose.

Population and conservation
Animals and plants find refuge in the protected areas of this ecoregion. Those include:
Lauca National Park
Sajama National Park
Eduardo Avaroa Andean Fauna National Reserve
Los Flamencos National Reserve
Olaroz-Cauchari Flora and Fauna Reserve
Llullaillaco National Park

Gallery

References

Montane grasslands and shrublands
Ecoregions of the Andes
Tropical Andes
Ecoregions of Argentina
Ecoregions of Bolivia
Ecoregions of Chile
Neotropical ecoregions